Oakland is an unincorporated community in Brazoria County, Texas, United States.  The community is located to the west of Freeport.

History 
Henry William Munson arrived in the area in 1828, and Oakland was the name of his plantation. The land was purchased by Munson from Stephen F. Austin,

References 

Unincorporated communities in Brazoria County, Texas
Unincorporated communities in Texas